Stefano Zamagni  (born 4 January 1943) is an Italian economist. Born in Rimini, Zamagni is Professor of Economics at the University of Bologna. Zamagni is also a fellow of the Human Development and Capability Association and President of the Pontifical Academy of Social Sciences.

Selected bibliography

Books

Chapters in books 
 Zamagni, Stefano (2005), “Happiness and individualism: a very difficult union” in L. Bruni e P. Porta (eds.), Economics and Happiness, Oxford, Oxford University Press, 2005, pp. 303–334.
 Zamagni, Stefano (2006), “The ethical anchoring of Corporate Social responsibility”, in L. Zsolnai (eds.), Interdisciplinary Yearbook of Business Ethics, Vol. I, 2006, pp. 31–51.

Journal articles

References

External links 
 Profile: Stefano Zamagni University of Bologna, Italy
 Profile: Stefano Zamagni Johns Hopkins University
 Profile: Stefano Zamagni Bologna Institute for Policy Research, Italy
 Profile: Stefano Zamagni Pontifical Academy of Social Sciences

1943 births
Living people
Johns Hopkins University faculty
Italian economists
Alumni of the University of Oxford
Members of the Pontifical Academy of Social Sciences
Knights of St. Gregory the Great